Alfred Adams may refer to:

 Alf Adams (born 1939), British physicist
 Alfred O. Adams (1897–1989), American politician in the Washington House of Representatives
 Alfred T. Adams (1898–1982), attorney and American football and basketball player and coach
 Alfred Walter Adams (died 1882), Manx lawyer